William Hopper (born 20 February 1938) is an English former footballer who played as a centre forward in the Football League for Halifax Town, Workington and Darlington, and in non-league football for several clubs in the north-east of England.

Life and career
Hopper was born in Bishop Auckland, County Durham, and began his football career with his hometown club. He moved on to Crook Town and then West Auckland Town – scoring five goals on his debut for each club, against Stanley United on each occasion, and in his last match for West Auckland, a Northern League club, scoring the equaliser as they came back from three goals behind to draw with Barnsley of the Football League Third Division in the 1960–61 FA Cup.

In 1961, he signed as a full-time professional with Halifax Town, two years later moved on to Workington, and finished his Football League career with six league appearances for Darlington as they were promoted from the Fourth Division in 1965–66. Hopper scored one of the goals as Darlington eliminated First Division club Blackpool, whose team contained four England internationals, from that season's League Cup. Knee cartilage problems meant he then dropped back into non-league football with South Shields and Stockton.

Before turning professional, he had worked as a steam locomotive fireman, and afterwards worked for engineering company GEC.

References
General
 
Specific

1938 births
Living people
Sportspeople from Bishop Auckland
Footballers from County Durham
English footballers
Association football forwards
Bishop Auckland F.C. players
Crook Town A.F.C. players
West Auckland Town F.C. players
Halifax Town A.F.C. players
Workington A.F.C. players
Darlington F.C. players
South Shields F.C. (1936) players
Northern Football League players
English Football League players